Igor Zlatanović (born 10 February 1998) is a Serbian footballer who plays as a forward for Israeli club Maccabi Netanya.

Club career
Born in Užice, Zlatanović passed FK Partizan youth categories. In summer 2015, he was loaned to Serbian League Belgrade side Teleoptik, where he scored 9 goals on 23 matches for the 2015–16 season. In summer 2016, he signed with Radnik Surdulica.

On 31 July 2019, Zlatanović moved abroad and signed a four-year deal with La Liga newcomers RCD Mallorca, but was loaned to Segunda División side CD Numancia on 16 August. On 18 September of the following year, he moved to fellow second division side CD Castellón also in a temporary deal.

International career
Zlatanović was a member of Serbia U16 and Serbia U17 national football teams between 2013 and 2014. He also played for U18 selection from 2015 to 2016 and scored 4 goals including 2 he scored in second half of match against Armenia in March 2016. In August 2016, Zlatanović was called into Serbia U19 squad for memorial tournament "Stevan Vilotić - Ćele", where he scored a goal in opening match against the United States. He also scored 2 goals in the final match of the tournament, against Israel.

Career statistics

Club

References

External links
 
 
 
 

1998 births
Living people
Serbian footballers
Sportspeople from Užice
FK Teleoptik players
FK Radnik Surdulica players
Segunda División players
RCD Mallorca players
CD Numancia players
CD Castellón footballers
Maccabi Netanya F.C. players
Red Star Belgrade footballers
Israeli Premier League players
Serbian SuperLiga players
Serbian expatriate footballers
Expatriate footballers in Spain
Expatriate footballers in Israel
Serbian expatriate sportspeople in Spain
Serbian expatriate sportspeople in Israel
Serbia youth international footballers
Serbia under-21 international footballers
Association football forwards